Christian Albert, Burgrave and Count of Dohna (also known as Christoph Albert, 10 December 1621 in Küstrin – 14 December 1677 in Gartz) was a German nobleman from the House of Dohna.

Early life 
He was the son of Count Christoph von Dohna and his wife, Countess Ursula of Solms-Braunfels (24 November 1594 in Braunfels – 18 August 1657 in Turnhout).  His brothers Frederick and Christopher Delphicus also served as army officers.  His first cousin Louise Henriette was Electress consort of Brandenburg.

Life 
He joined the Dutch army, initially serving as ensign.  He was educated by Prince Frederick Henry and in 1684, he was promoted to colonel.  On 6 October 1656, he became a Lieutenant in the army of Brandenburg.  He also served as privy councillor and governor of Küstrin.  On 16 March 1657, he became stadtholder of Halberstadt and Captain at Gröningen.  In 1659, he participated in a campaign in Pomerania.  He expanded the fortresses of Berlin and Küstrin and on 2 March 1666, he was promoted to General of the Infantry.  In 1671, he became head of a newly formed regiment in Küstrin that was named after him ("").  In 1672, he was appointed Feldzeugmeister.  From 1675 to 1677, he fought another campaign in Pomerania, where he died in 1677. He served as a general in the army of Brandenburg.

Marriage and issue 
On 6 April 1644, Christian Albert married Countess Sophie Theodore of Brederode-Vianen (16 March 1620 in Vianen – 23 September 1678 in Halberstadt).  Together, they had six sons, who were also army officers, and four daughters:
 Frederick Henry (1645-1668), fell before Toulon
 Wolfard (1647 – 8 September 1686), Captain in the Brandenburg army; died in a duel in Magdeburg
 William Albert (d. 1673), Colonel in the Dutch army; fell before Maastricht
 Christopher (1651 – 27 October 1672 in Koblenz),  in the Brandenburg army
 Charles Emil (10 September 1658 – 3 July 1686), colonel in the Brandenburg army; fell before Buda
 Dietrich Theodor (5 December 1659 – 17 July 1686), colonel in the Brandenburg army; fell before Buda
 Louise (1646 – 8 November 1687), married in 1670 to Louis of Solms-Hohensolms (1646 – 24 August 1707)
 Amalia (2 February 1654 – 11 March 1700), married in 1666 to Simon Henry, Count of Lippe (1639-1697)
 Ursula Anna (12 August 1654 – 25 May 1678)
 Frederike Marie (28 December 1660 – 22 November 1729), married in 1690 to Christopher I, Burgrave and Count of Dohna-Schlodien (1665-1733), a son of her uncle Frederick

Footnotes

References 

Kurt von Priesdorff (ed.): Soldatisches Führertum, Hanseatische Verlagsanstalt, Hamburg, 1937, vol. 1, p. 14

External links 
 
 Genealogy of Dohna

Prussian generals
Counts of Germany
1621 births
1677 deaths
17th-century German military personnel